Same-sex marriage in North Carolina has been legally recognized since October 10, 2014, when a U.S. District Court judge ruled in General Synod of the United Church of Christ v. Cooper that the state's denial of marriage rights to same-sex couples was unconstitutional. Governor Pat McCrory and Attorney General Roy Cooper had acknowledged that a recent ruling in the Fourth Circuit Court of Appeals and the U.S. Supreme Court's decision not to hear an appeal in that case established the unconstitutionality of North Carolina's ban on same-sex marriage. State legislators sought without success to intervene in lawsuits to defend the state's ban on same-sex marriage.

North Carolina had previously denied marriage rights to same-sex couples by statute since 1996. A state constitutional amendment that was approved in 2012 reinforced that by defining marriage between a man and a woman as the only valid "domestic legal union" in the state and denying recognition to any similar legal status, such as civil unions. Some cities in the state recognize domestic partnerships, and some make that status available to both same-sex and opposite-sex couples.

Legal history

Statute
On June 18, 1996, the North Carolina State Senate passed a bill banning same-sex marriage and the recognition of same-sex marriages performed out of state by a vote of 41–4. That same day, the North Carolina House of Representatives voted 98–10 in favor of the bill. It was ratified by Governor Jim Hunt and went into effect on June 20, 1996.

Constitution
On September 12, 2011, the House of Representatives voted 75–42 in favor of North Carolina Amendment 1, a constitutional amendment banning same-sex marriage and any "domestic legal union". On September 13, 2011, the Senate voted 30–16 in favor of the bill. On May 8, 2012, North Carolina voters approved of the amendment by a vote of 61.04% to 38.96%.

The amendment added to Section XIV of the Constitution of North Carolina:

North Carolina was the 30th U.S. state, and the last of the former Confederate states, to adopt a constitutional amendment defining marriage so as to exclude same-sex couples.

Lawsuits

Mullinax v. Covington
On March 22, 2004, Richard Mullinax and Perry Pike, a same-sex couple from Durham, filed suit against county officials, arguing that the county must issue them a marriage license, even though state law forbade same-sex marriage. County officials filed a motion to dismiss the lawsuit. The case was heard and dismissed without prejudice on May 10, 2004 by a district court judge.

Fisher-Borne v. Smith and Gerber v. Cooper
On June 13, 2012, six same-sex couples filed a federal lawsuit, Fisher-Borne v. Smith, that initially sought the right to obtain stepchild adoptions. In July 2013, following the June U.S. Supreme Court decision in United States v. Windsor, they amended their suit to challenge the constitutionality of the state's denial of marriage rights to same-sex couples. They were represented by the American Civil Liberties Union (ACLU) and private attorneys. Briefing was completed on August 13, 2014. Three same-sex couples filed Gerber v. Cooper in federal court in April 2014 seeking North Carolina's recognition of their marriages, which were established in other jurisdictions. They were represented by the ACLU and private attorneys. Briefing was completed on August 13, 2014. Proceedings in both cases were stayed pending the outcome of a Virginia case, Bostic v. Schaefer. The U.S. Supreme Court declined the appeal in that case on October 6, 2014, leaving the Fourth Circuit's decision, which found Virginia's ban on same-sex marriage unconstitutional, as binding precedent on courts in North Carolina. On July 28, after the Fourth Circuit Court of Appeals' ruling in Bostic, the North Carolina Attorney General, Roy Cooper, had announced that he would no longer defend the state's ban on same-sex marriage. He said that because all judges in North Carolina were bound by the Fourth Circuit's precedent, "today we know our law will almost surely be overturned as well. Simply put, it's time to stop making arguments we will lose and instead move forward knowing the ultimate resolution will likely come from the United States Supreme Court."

On October 8, 2014, Judge William Osteen of the U.S. District Court for the Middle District of North Carolina lifted those stays and invited plaintiffs' attorneys to present the court with a motion to rule North Carolina's ban on same-sex marriage unconstitutional. The plaintiffs in both cases filed a joint motion asking the court to issue such an order. They modeled their suggested language on the order issued in Bostic. On October 9, two leaders of the North Carolina General Assembly, Thom Tillis, the Speaker of the House of Representatives, and Philip Berger, the President pro tempore of the Senate, asked to be allowed to intervene to defend the state's ban. Their filing said: "This intervention is about ensuring that the choice made by North Carolina voters receives its day in Court." They contended that "because Bostic was based in part on outcome-determinative concessions made by the Virginia Attorney General that have not been made in this litigation, Bostic does not control." If the district court determined that Bostic controlled the decision in these cases, they proposed to pursue appeals of that judgment to the Fourth Circuit, the Fourth Circuit en banc, and the U.S. Supreme Court. On October 14, Judge Osteen allowed them to intervene solely to preserve their right to appeal. He ruled for the plaintiffs the same day. He found Bostic controlling since North Carolina's and Virginia's bans were virtually identical, held North Carolina's ban unconstitutional, and enjoined the state from enforcing its ban on same-sex marriage.

On December 16, the Fourth Circuit consolidated these cases and put proceedings on hold pending action by the U.S. Supreme Court on certiorari petitions in Obergefell v. Hodges and related cases. On January 14, 2015, Berger and Tillis petitioned the U.S. Supreme Court to review the case without waiting for review by the Fourth Circuit Court of Appeals. The Supreme Court ruled on June 26, 2015 that state same-sex marriage bans violate the Due Process and Equal Protection clauses of the Fourteenth Amendment. The decision legalized same-sex marriage nationwide in the United States. Lieutenant Governor Dan Forest condemned the court ruling, saying, "The power grab by a majority of the Supreme Court is a full-on assault on the founding principles of democratic process, federalism, separation of powers, the voice of the people and judicial restraint." Michael Francis Burbidge, the Roman Catholic Bishop of Raleigh, said, "The true definition of marriage cannot be redefined by courts. It remains the permanent union of one man and one woman, oriented to the procreation and raising of children. The Catholic Church, along with many other Christian and religious traditions, will continue our work with regard to this true definition of marriage and to strengthen the moral basis for all such relationships." The ACLU issued the following statement, "The Supreme Court today welcomed same-sex couples fully into the American family. Gay and lesbian couples and our families may be at peace knowing that our simple request to be treated like everyone else – that is, to be able to participate in the dignity of marriage – has finally been granted. Today's historic victory comes on the backs of same-sex couples and advocates who have worked for decades to dismantle harmful stereotypes and unjust laws in the quest for equal treatment." State Representative Larry Hall called it a "victory for equality", and the Mayor of Chapel Hill, Mark Kleinschmidt, called it "a great day for all Americans and for the promise of our democracy". David Price, representing North Carolina's 4th congressional district, said, "I join many of my constituents, some of whom have been waiting for this moment for a long time, in celebrating today's Supreme Court decision, which continues the remarkable progress we have made as a country toward equal rights for all Americans, regardless of sexual orientation or gender identity. I am reminded this morning of the landmark cases of the Civil Rights era, when justice finally won out over long-standing prejudice."

General Synod of the United Church of Christ v. Cooper
On April 28, 2014, the United Church of Christ, joined by a coalition of Baptists, Lutherans, and Unitarian Universalists, filed a lawsuit, arguing that North Carolina's statute that made it a crime to preside at the solemnization of the marriage of a couple that lacked a valid state marriage license unconstitutionally restricted religious freedom. On June 3, 2014, additional national religious denominations and clergy were added as plaintiffs, including the Alliance of Baptists, the Association of Welcoming and Affirming Baptists, and the Central Conference of American Rabbis in addition to Episcopal, Jewish and Baptist clergy. Dr. Reverend Nancy Petty of the Pullen Memorial Baptist Church, a plaintiff in the case, said, "By preventing our same-sex congregants from forming their own families, the North Carolina ban on same-sex marriage burdens my ability and the ability of my congregation to form a faith community of our choosing consistent with the principles of our faith." Reverend Nancy Allison, pastor of the Holy Covenant United Church of Christ and another plaintiff, said, "North Carolina judges some of its citizens as unfit for the blessings of God. We reject that notion. […] The sacraments of baptism and communion are open to all. So should all God's children be able to receive marriage." A spokesperson for the Roman Catholic Diocese of Charlotte condemned the lawsuit, saying "This lawsuit does not change the fact that God created men and women differently. The fruits of that difference are marriage and the continuance of the human race through children." Tami Fitzgerald, executive director of the North Carolina Values Coalition, a group that opposes same-sex marriage, said, "[I]t's both ironic and sad that an entire religious denomination and its clergy who purport holding to Christian teachings on marriage would look to the courts to justify their errant beliefs. These individuals are simply revisionists that distort the teaching of Scripture to justify sexual revolution, not marital sanctity." Paul Gallant, a commentator for The News & Observer, issued the following statement, "I find it interesting that right-wing Christians pushed this into law because [same-sex marriage is] ... against their religious beliefs and now left-wing Christians say the law violates their Christian beliefs. How about we leave marriage up to individuals and leave the government out of it? Less government! You would think right wingers would be all for this."

On October 7, the plaintiffs asked for an immediate injunction against the state, citing the Fourth Circuit's ruling in Bostic. On October 10, Judge Max O. Cogburn, Jr. of the U.S. District Court for the Western District of North Carolina denied a request by leaders of the General Assembly to be allowed to intervene to defend the state's ban and ruled the state's ban on same-sex marriage unconstitutional. He wrote:

The decision legalized same-sex marriage in North Carolina with immediate effect. The first same-sex couple to marry in the state were Chad Biggs and Chris Creech in Raleigh on Friday, October 10. Chris Sgro, executive director of Equality North Carolina, said "Today's ruling allowing loving, same-sex couples to marry across North Carolina is a historic moment for our state. With it, we celebrate with so many North Carolinians who have worked tirelessly over decades to change hearts, minds, and unequal laws in the state we call home. Love won and the barriers to it are done." Governor Pat McCrory said "[his] administration is moving forward with the execution of the court's ruling." In Raleigh, Asheville and Greensboro, county offices stayed open late to issue marriage licenses to same-sex couples. Charlotte said it would open its office on Monday, October 13.

Developments after legalization

Religious exemption for magistrates

When the decision in General Synod took effect, state officials announced that judges were required to preside at marriage ceremonies for same-sex couples just as they would at those for different-sex couples and that a judge could not claim an exemption on religious grounds. By early November, six judges had resigned citing religious objections. A group of Republican legislators led by Senate President Philip Berger announced plans to sponsor legislation creating a religious exemption for state magistrates who object to participating at same-sex weddings on religious grounds. Such legislation passed the General Assembly in May 2015, though was vetoed by Governor McCrory. On June 3, 2015, the Senate successfully overrode McCrory's veto by a vote of 32–16, reaching the three-fifths majority needed for overriding a veto in the Senate. An override vote was held in the House of Representatives on June 11, 2015, achieving the three-fifths majority required by a margin of 69–41. As a result, the measure became law in North Carolina, which is just the second state after Utah to allow for this sort of religious exemption for state magistrates.

A lawsuit arguing that the exemption was unconstitutional was filed in federal court on 9 December 2015. On June 28, 2017, a three-judge panel of the Fourth Circuit, composed of J. Harvie Wilkinson III, Barbara Milano Keenan and Stephanie Thacker, dismissed the lawsuit because the couples who brought the suit lacked standing as none of them had been turned down by a state magistrate. At the time the lawsuit was filed, roughly 5 percent of magistrates were refusing to marry same-sex couples for religious reasons. This included every magistrate in McDowell County.

Attempt to pass unconstitutional legislation
On April 11, 2017, three Republicans legislators introduced the Uphold Historical Marriage Act to the General Assembly. The bill sought to reenact the state's same-sex marriage ban, thus being in violation of Obergefell v. Hodges, the U.S. Supreme Court ruling which held that same-sex couples have a nationwide fundamental right to marry. The bill claimed the Supreme Court "overstepped its constitutional bounds". It also quoted the Bible, saying "the ruling exceeds the authority of the court relative to the decree of Almighty God that a man shall leave his father and his mother and hold fast to his wife, and they shall become one flesh". Governor Cooper subsequently announced his opposition to the bill, tweeting "We need more LGBT protections, not fewer." The following day, House Speaker Tim Moore denied the bill a hearing, effectively killing it. Moore said that "there are strong constitutional concerns with this legislation given that the U.S. Supreme Court has firmly ruled on the issue."

Native American nations
Same-sex marriage is not legal on the reservation of the Eastern Band of Cherokee Indians. Tribal law specifies that the marriage "between a man and a woman" is recognized if a license is obtained from a register of deeds in their county of residence or the Cherokee Court; however, tribal law also states that all marriages, which have been solemnized according to the laws of North Carolina or any other state or Native American nation, will be given full faith and credit by the tribe. On December 11, 2014, a resolution reaffirming the wording was passed, ensuring that marriage ceremonies will not be performed within tribal jurisdiction. Licenses issued to same-sex couples elsewhere continue to be recognized, however. In September 2021, the Tribal Council voted 8–3 to reject a resolution which would have legalized same-sex marriage on the reservation. The resolution was introduced by Tamara Thompson, a member of the LGBT community. Chelsea Taylor Saunooke, who supported the resolution, said, "She's [her girlfriend] my fiancé. I hope we can get married here. If not. Maybe I can wait for the day to come. But thank you, to those who aren't in support for violating your co-council member's rights." It is likely that Cherokee society had a designation like two-spirit for individuals who were born male but wore women's clothing and performed everyday household work and artistic handiwork which were regarded as belonging to the feminine sphere, but a lot of traditional knowledge was lost during the adoption of Christianity and during the Trail of Tears for those Cherokee forcibly removed to the Indian Territory. Among the Cherokee,   (asegi udando) refers to people who either fall outside of men's and women's roles or who occupy both men's and women's roles.

Demographics and marriage statistics
Data from the 2000 U.S. census showed that 16,198 same-sex couples were living in North Carolina. By 2005, this had increased to 19,648 couples, likely attributed to same-sex couples' growing willingness to disclose their partnerships on government surveys. Same-sex couples lived in all counties of the state and constituted 0.9% of coupled households and 0.5% of all households in the state. Most couples lived in Mecklenburg, Wake and Guilford counties, but the counties with the highest percentage of same-sex couples were Durham (0.85% of all county households) and Buncombe (0.79%). Same-sex partners in North Carolina were on average younger than opposite-sex partners, and more likely to be employed. However, the average and median household incomes of same-sex couples were lower than different-sex couples, and same-sex couples were also far less likely to own a home than opposite-sex partners. 22% of same-sex couples in North Carolina were raising children under the age of 18, with an estimated 7,437 children living in households headed by same-sex couples in 2005.

Domestic partnerships

Some cities and counties in North Carolina recognize domestic partnerships. Registered domestic partners are legally recognized only by the jurisdiction in which they registered. The partnerships allow the extension of health care benefits to employees and their domestic partners. Some cities in the state recognize both same-sex and opposite-sex domestic partnerships. According to 2010 census data, there were 228,000 North Carolina couples in domestic partnerships and 12 percent of those were same-sex couples. In 2008, the General Assembly added a provision to state law, affording hospital visitation rights to same-sex couples though a designated visitor statute.

The first town to establish domestic partnerships was Carrboro in 1994, which permits such partnerships between any two persons who are residents of the town of Carrboro or at least one of whom is an employee of the town of Carrboro. Chapel Hill followed suit in 1995, allowing for the registration of domestic partnerships between any two adults who live together in a long-term relationship of indefinite duration, with an exclusive mutual commitment in which the partners share the necessities of life and are financially interdependent, and also are not married to anyone else, do not have another domestic partner and not related by blood more closely than would bar their marriage in the state.Durham became the first city to allow domestic partnerships in 2003. Durham County did the same later that same year, becoming the first county in the state to do so. In December of that same year, commissioners in Orange County approved a measure to extend benefits to the domestic partners of county employees. Benefits available include dependent health, dental, life, retiree health insurance, funeral leave, sick leave, shared leave and family leave of absence. The estimated cost for one percent of Orange County (or seven employees) to participate in domestic partnerships was $17,000 for the county's contribution. Greensboro began offering domestic partnerships in 2007. The City Council was initially concerned that by offering domestic partner benefits they would be in violation of North Carolina's crime against nature law as well as federal equal protection laws if they offered those benefits to same-sex couples and not unmarried heterosexual couples.

Mecklenburg County passed a policy allowing domestic partner benefits for county employees and their partners in December 2009. The approved plan defines "domestic partners" as two people of the same sex in a "spousal like" and "exclusive, mutually committed" relationship in which both "share the necessities of life and are financially interdependent". On February 22, 2011, Asheville authorized the creation of a domestic partnership registry to recognize same-sex relationships, becoming the first city in Western North Carolina to do so. The registry became available on May 2, 2011. Charlotte created its own domestic partnership registry, separate from Mecklenburg County, in 2013. Also in 2013, Buncombe County became the 4th North Carolina county to allow domestic partnerships.

Public opinion
{| class="wikitable"
|+style="font-size:100%" | Public opinion for same-sex marriage in North Carolina
|-
! style="width:190px;"| Poll source
! style="width:200px;"| Date(s)administered
! class=small | Samplesize
! Margin oferror
! style="width:100px;"| % support
! style="width:100px;"| % opposition
! style="width:40px;"| % no opinion
! style="width:40px;"| % refused
|-
| Public Religion Research Institute
| align=center| March 8–November 9, 2021
| align=center| ?
| align=center| ?
|  align=center| 66%
| align=center| 32%
| align=center| 2%
| align=center| —
|-
| Public Religion Research Institute
| align=center| January 7–December 20, 2020
| align=center| 1,730 random telephoneinterviewees
| align=center| ?
|  align=center| 62%
| align=center| 32%
| align=center| 6%
| align=center| —
|-
| Public Religion Research Institute
| align=center| April 5–December 23, 2017
| align=center| 2,499 random telephoneinterviewees
| align=center| ?
|  align=center| 49%| align=center| 41%
| align=center| 10%
| align=center| —
|-
| Public Religion Research Institute
| align=center| May 18, 2016–January 10, 2017
| align=center| 3,544 random telephoneinterviewees
| align=center| ?
|  align=center| 49%| align=center| 40%
| align=center| 11%
| align=center| —
|-
| Public Religion Research Institute
| align=center| April 29, 2015–January 7, 2016
| align=center| 2,855 random telephoneinterviewees
| align=center| ?
| align=center| 46%
|  align=center| 47%| align=center| 7%
| align=center| —
|-
| rowspan=3 colspan=1 | Elon University
| rowspan=3 colspan=1 align=center | October 21–25, 2014
| align=center| 1,084 adult residents
| align=center| ± 2.98%
| align=center| 42.6%
|  align=center| 46.5%| align=center| 10.2%
| align=center| 0.7%
|-
| align=center| 996 registered voters
| align=center| ± 3.11%
| align=center| 41.7%
|  align=center| 47%| align=center| 10.6%
| align=center| 0.7%
|-
| align=center| 687 likely voters
| align=center| ± 3.74%
| align=center| 38.7%
|  align=center| 49.8%| align=center| 10.8%
| align=center| 0.7%
|-
| High Point University
| align=center| October 21–25, 2014
| align=center| 802
| align=center| ± 3.5%
| align=center| 36%
|  align=center| 58%
| align=center| 6%
| align=center| —
|-
| New York Times/CBS News/YouGov
| align=center| September 20–October 1, 2014
| align=center| 2002
| align=center| ± 2.5%
| align=center| 42%
|  align=center| 46%| align=center| 12%
| align=center| —
|-
| rowspan=2 colspan=1 | American Insights
| rowspan=2 colspan=1 align=center | September 5–10, 2014
| align=center| 600 registered voters
| align=center| ± 4%
| align=center| 46%| align=center| 46%| align=center| 9%
| align=center| —
|-
| align=center| 459 likely voters
| align=center| ± 4.6%
| align=center| 44%
|  align=center| 48%| align=center| 8%
| align=center| —
|-
| rowspan=3 colspan=1 | Elon University
| rowspan=3 colspan=1 align=center | September 5–9, 2014
| align=center| 1,078 adult residents
| align=center| ± 2.98%
|  align=center| 45.3%| align=center| 41.8%
| align=center| 12.4%
| align=center| 0.5%
|-
| align=center| 983 registered voters
| align=center| ± 3.13%
|  align=center| 45%| align=center| 41.9%
| align=center| 12.7%
| align=center| 0.4%
|-
| align=center| 629 likely voters
| align=center| ± 3.91%
|  align=center| 45.1%| align=center| 42.5%
| align=center| 11.7%
| align=center| 0.7%
|-
| Elon University
| align=center| April 25–28, 2014
| align=center| 672
| align=center| ± 3.78%
| align=center| 40.7%
|  align=center| 46.4%| align=center| 12.9%
| align=center| —
|-
| New York Times/Kaiser Family Foundation
| align=center| April 8–15, 2014
| align=center| 900 registered voters
| align=center| ?
| align=center| 44%
|  align=center| 49%| align=center| 7%
| align=center| —
|-
| Public Religion Research Institute
| align=center| April 2, 2014–January 4, 2015
| align=center| 1,864
| align=center| ± 0.4%
| align=center| 44%
|  align=center| 49%| align=center| 7%
| align=center| —
|-
| Public Policy Polling
| align=center| April 3–6, 2014
| align=center| 740
| align=center| ± 3.6%
| align=center| 40%
|  align=center| 53%
| align=center| 7%
| align=center| —
|-
| Elon University
| align=center| February 23–26, 2014
| align=center| 925
| align=center| ± 3.22%
| align=center| 39.7%
|  align=center| 51.3%
| align=center| 8.8%
| align=center| 0.2%
|-
| Public Religion Research Institute
| align=center| November 12–December 18, 2013
| align=center| 165
| align=center| ± 8.9%
| align=center| 47%
|  align=center| 48%| align=center| 5%
| align=center| —
|-
| Elon University
| align=center| September 13–16, 2013
| align=center| 701
| align=center| ± 3.7%
| align=center| 42.6%
|  align=center| 46.5%| align=center| 10.9%
| align=center| —
|-
| Elon University
| align=center| April 5–9, 2013
| align=center| 770
| align=center| ± 3.53%
| align=center| 43.2%
|  align=center| 45.9%''
| align=center| 10.5%
| align=center| 0.5%
|-
| Public Policy Polling
| align=center| February 7–10, 2013
| align=center| 600
| align=center| ± 4%
| align=center| 38%
|  align=center| 54%
| align=center| 9%
| align=center| —
|-
| Public Policy Polling
| align=center| May 10–13, 2012
| align=center| 666
| align=center| ± 3.8%
| align=center| 34%
|  align=center| 58%
| align=center| 8%
| align=center| —
|-
| Public Policy Polling
| align=center| May 5–6, 2012
| align=center| 1,026
| align=center| ± 3.1%
| align=center| 34%
|  align=center| 57%
| align=center| 9%
| align=center| —
|-
| Public Policy Polling
| align=center| December 1–4, 2011
| align=center| 865
| align=center| ± 3.3%
| align=center| 30%
|  align=center| 57%
| align=center| 13%
| align=center| —
|-
| Public Policy Polling
| align=center|September 1–4, 2011
| align=center| 520
| align=center| ± 4.3%
| align=center| 31%
|  align=center| 61%
| align=center| 8%
| align=center| —
|-

See also

 LGBT rights in North Carolina
 Same-sex marriage in the Fourth Circuit
 North Carolina Religious Coalition for Marriage Equality
 Status of same-sex marriage
 Timeline of same-sex marriage
 Same-sex marriage in the United States

Notes

References

External links
Website of Equality North Carolina, a group that supports same-sex marriage
Website of North Carolina Values Coalition, a group that opposes same-sex marriage

LGBT rights in North Carolina
North Carolina law
North Carolina
2014 in LGBT history
2014 in North Carolina